The 2012 Philippine Basketball Association (PBA) Governors' Cup Finals is the best-of-7 championship series of the 2012 PBA Governors' Cup, and the conclusion of the conference's playoffs. The Rain or Shine Elasto Painters and the B-Meg Llamados competed for the 106th championship contested by the league.

Rain or Shine won the series, four games to three, capturing their first championship in their franchise history. The Elasto Painters also prevented a possible series comeback from B-Meg after the Llamados won games 5 and 6 coming from a 1–3 deficit, in which last time to do so was during the 1991 First Conference Finals when Ginebra San Miguel won against Shell Rimula X from a 1–3 deficit.

Background

Road to the finals

Head-to-head matchup

Series summary

Game 1

Game 2

Game 3

Game 4

Game 5

Game 6

Game 7

Rosters

{| class="toccolours" style="font-size: 95%; width: 100%;"
|-
! colspan="2" style="background-color: #215489; color: #FFFFFF; text-align: center;" | Rain or Shine Elasto Painters Governors' Cup roster
|- style="background-color:#1FA3E4; color: #F7D736; text-align: center;"
! Players !! Coaches
|-
| valign="top" |
{| class="sortable" style="background:transparent; margin:0px; width:100%;"
! Pos. !! # !! POB !! Name !! Height !! Weight !! !! College 
|-

{| class="toccolours" style="font-size: 95%; width: 100%;"
|-
! colspan="2" style="background-color: #f10d0d; color: #FDD501; text-align: center;" | B-Meg Llamados Governors' Cup roster
|- style="background-color:#000000; color: #FFFFFF; text-align: center;"
! Players !! Coaches
|-
| valign="top" |
{| class="sortable" style="background:transparent; margin:0px; width:100%;"
! Pos. !! # !! POB !!  Name !! Height !! Weight !! !! College 
|-

Broadcast notes

Additional Game 7 crew:
Trophy presentation: Aaron Atayde
Dugout celebration interviewer: Erika Padilla

References

External links
PBA official website

2011–12 PBA season
2012
Rain or Shine Elasto Painters games
Magnolia Hotshots games
PBA Governors' Cup Finals
PBA Governors' Cup Finals